Viescas is one of 28 parishes (administrative divisions) in Salas, a municipality within the province and autonomous community of Asturias, in northern Spain.

Villages and hamlets
Carlés (Carllés)
El Pevidal
El Piñedo (El Peñéu)
La Venta 
Pereras (Preras)
Viescas (Biescas)

References

Parishes in Salas